Baylie is a surname.  Notable people with the surname include:

 Richard Baylie (1585–1667), English academic
 Thomas Baylie (1582–1663), English clergyman

See also
 Bailey (disambiguation)